Portimão is a freguesia (parish) in the municipality of Portimão (Algarve, Portugal). The population in 2011 was 45,431, in an area of 75.66 km².

Main sites
Colégio dos Jesuítas Convent
Misericórdia Church 
Nossa Senhora da Conceição Church
Santa Catarina Fort
São Francisco Convent or Nossa Senhora da Esperança Convent

References

Parishes of Portimão